Hardiya is a village in Tarari block of Bhojpur district, Bihar, India. It is located in the western part of the block, near the border with Piro block. As of 2011, its population was 1,591, in 216 households.

References 

Villages in Bhojpur district, India